Spike: Asylum is a five-issue comic book limited series based on Angel television series. It was released from September 2006 through January 2007. The five issues were collected together in a single trade paperback in May 2007.

Plot

Ruby Monahan has gone missing and her family recruits Spike to track her down. It seems Ruby (a half-demon) has been checked into "Mosaic Wellness Center", a rehab facility designed to cure the demonic. Evidence shows Ruby is instead being tortured severely inside Mosaic so Spike agrees to infiltrate. 

Whatever is going on, many of the clients do want to murder Spike, having a history with him, and are willing to hurt his newfound encounter-group friends to do so. And just where is Ruby anyway?

Writing and artwork

Cultural references
The Usual Suspects: A 1995 movie written by Christopher McQuarrie, directed by Bryan Singer, and starring Kevin Spacey. The cover for Asylum #2 is an homage to promotional material from this movie.
Smallville: In Asylum #3, a character calls Spike Brainiac, a character that actor James Marsters played in season 5 of the television series about a young Superman.
Firefly: When Lorne is seen performing in Las Vegas at the end of issue 3, he is performing the theme to Firefly, a Joss Whedon television show. Whedon is also the creator of both Buffy the Vampire Slayer and Angel.
Ghostbusters: Ivo Shandor, the Gozerian cultist/architect, is named as the person who built the Mosaic Asylum. Specific lines from the movie are mentioned ("society being too sick to survive", etc.), and Spike muses on why the name is familiar to him.

Continuity

Timing
In his blog, writer Brian Lynch has commented on when the comics takes place within Buffyverse continuity:

Canonical issues

Angel comics are not usually considered by fans as canon. However unlike fanfic, 'overviews' summarising their story, written early in the writing process, were 'approved' by both Fox and Whedon (or his office), and the books were therefore later published as officially Angel merchandise.

Later, Betta George from Asylum appears in Lynch and Joss Whedon's canonical Angel: After the Fall. The Mosaic Wellness Center is seen briefly, and Spike refers to him and George as going "way back". Later references under Lynch's pen as the series went on (such as in the After the Fall Epilogue in issue #23) would place the events of Spike: Asylum more definitively within the chronology of the series.

References

External links
Idwpublishing.com - Preview of first five pages (without dialogue)
Whedonesque.com Whedonesquers discuss the comic (May 2006)
Comicscontinuum.com - Lynch comments on his approach to writing (July 2006)

Angel (1999 TV series) comics
Comics based on Buffy the Vampire Slayer
IDW Publishing titles
2006 comics debuts
2007 comics endings
Fantasy comics